M. grande may refer to:
 Memecylon grande, a plant species endemic to Sri Lanka
 Morum grande, a sea snail species

See also
 Grande (disambiguation)